Saik or Sa-ik may be:
Hong Sa-ik, Korean general in the Imperial Japanese Army during World War II
Jang Sa-ik, South Korean singer
Courtesy name of late Joseon dynasty artist Kim Su-cheol

SAIK may be:
Sandvikens AIK, Swedish sports club involved in bandy and football
Sillhövda AIK, Swedish football club
Skellefteå AIK, Swedish hockey club
Skövde AIK, Swedish football club